Lissa Hunter (born November 13, 1945) is an American artist known for her basketry, drawing and mixed media work. Her professional activities include teaching, writing, and a long association with Haystack Mountain School of Crafts in Deer Isle, Maine as teacher, student and trustee.

Early life
Hunter was born in Indianapolis, Indiana to C. McCord Purdy, salesman and magician, and Ruth Gordon Purdy, secretary and untrained artist. She attended Indiana University in Bloomington, Indiana where she studied drawing and painting, attaining the BA degree in 1967, and the MFA degree in Textiles in 1971.

Professional practice
After having taught at Mansfield State College (now Mansfield University) in Mansfield, Pennsylvania from 1971 to 1978, Hunter left Pennsylvania to work as a full-time artist, living in South Berwick, Maine. At the time, she was weaving tapestries but was soon drawn to the burgeoning fields of papermaking and basketry. It was at this time that she developed her own technique of applying paper to her coiled baskets as well as making collages of painted and stitched paper and fabric. Hunter continued these two paths after moving to Portland, Maine in 1984.  In 1994, she merged the two-dimensional and three-dimensional imagery into wall-mounted sculptures that remain her trademark work. While she continues in this vein, Hunter also explores drawing, painting and printmaking. She also teaches workshops and writes as a complementary part of her professional life.

Gallery

Collections
Museum of Art and Design, New York City
Museum of Fine Arts, Boston, Massachusetts
Smithsonian American Art Museum, Renwick Gallery, Washington D.C.
The Racine Art Museum, Racine, Wisconsin
Houston Museum of Fine Arts, Houston, Texas
The Arkansas Arts Center, Little Rock, Arkansas
The Albuquerque Museum, Albuquerque, New Mexico

References

Vision & Legacy: Celebrating the Architecture of Haystack, Brynmorgen Press, 2011.
Janet Koplos and Bruce Metcalf. Makers: A History of American Studio Craft, UNC Press, 2010.
Jo Lauria and Steve Fenton. Clarkson Potter, Craft In America: Celebrating Two Centuries of Artists and Objects, Clarkson Potter (Random House), 2007. 
Abby Johnston. Lissa Hunter Histories Real & Imagined, Upala Press, 2006. 
Edited by Rob Pulleyn. The Basketmaker's Art, Lark Books, 1987.

External links
 Official site

American women artists
Indiana University alumni
Artists from Indianapolis
1945 births
Living people
People from South Berwick, Maine
Artists from Portland, Maine
People from Deer Isle, Maine
21st-century American women